is a Japanese actress.

External links

JMDb profile (in Japanese)

1974 births
Living people
People from Itabashi
Actresses from Tokyo